Broadway is a tram stop on the Eccles Line of Greater Manchester's light rail Metrolink system. It opened to passengers on 12 June 1999 as part of Phase 2 of the network's expansion, and is located in the Salford Quays area of the City of Salford, in North West England.

Services

Service pattern
12 minute service to Ashton-under-Lyne (via MediaCityUK at offpeak times).
12 minute service to Eccles.

Connecting bus routes
Broadway tram stop is served by Diamond Bus North West service 29 and Stagecoach Manchester service 50, linking Salford Shopping Centre in Pendleton, Salford Crescent railway station, Salford University, Salford Central railway station, Manchester and East Didsbury with Salford Quays and MediaCityUK.

References

External links
Broadway Stop Information
Broadway area map

Tram stops in Salford
Salford Quays